Tekirdağspor is a Turkish sports club based in Tekirdağ, mainly concentrated on football.

Tekirdağspor were crowned champions of Turkish Regional Amateur League Group 11 during the 2014–15 season.

They play in yellow and black kits.

History
Founded in 1967, the club played in TFF First League (Then Second League) for 9 seasons.

Stadium
Currently the team plays at the 5000 capacity Namık Kemal Stadyumu.

League participations
TFF First League: 1977–1986
TFF Second League: 1967–1977, 1986–2001
TFF Third League: 2001–2004, 2015–present
Turkish Regional Amateur League: 2010–2011, 2012–2015
Amatör Futbol Ligleri: 2004–2010, 2011–2012

References

External links
Official website
Tekirdağspor on TFF.org

 
Association football clubs established in 1967
1967 establishments in Turkey
Sport in Tekirdağ